Thomas M. Schaus (born June 7, 1937, in Milwaukee, Wisconsin), was a member of the Wisconsin State Assembly. He graduated from West Division High School as well as Marquette University and the University of Wisconsin Law School. Schaus also served in the United States Marine Corps Reserve. He was a member of the Knights of Columbus and the Society of the Holy Name. He practiced law in Milwaukee. He died on May 11, 2004.

Political career
Schaus was elected to the Assembly in 1964. He was a Democrat.

References

Politicians from Milwaukee
Democratic Party members of the Wisconsin State Assembly
Wisconsin lawyers
Military personnel from Milwaukee
United States Marines
Marquette University alumni
University of Wisconsin Law School alumni
1937 births
2004 deaths
20th-century American politicians
20th-century American lawyers